Charles Boateng (born 14 December 1989) is a Ghanaian footballer who plays for French club US Avranches.

Club career
Born in Mampong, Boateng began his career with Nania F.C. and played with his team at the youth cup in Altstetten 2004 and 2005, reaching the final. Boateng was loaned to Tema Youth for a year in January 2007 and was a member of the Ghana Premier League All Star team 2007. After a trial in June 2007, he moved in January 2008 from Nania to Dijon FCO.

He was one of the players to be banned from the Ghana Division 2 after the match-fixing scandal with Nania and Okwawu United.

After three seasons with Dijon FCO, Boateng signed on 14 June 2010 for FC Rouen.

In January 2012, Boateng signed for US Avranches.

International career
He also played for Ghana U17 team at 2005 FIFA U-17 World Championship.

References

External links

1989 births
Living people
Ghanaian footballers
Ghanaian expatriate footballers
Dijon FCO players
Ligue 2 players
Championnat National players
Championnat National 2 players
Championnat National 3 players
Expatriate footballers in France
Association football midfielders
F.C. Nania players
Okwawu United players
Tema Youth players
FC Rouen players
US Avranches players